Bergen Mekaniske Verksted, later Bergens Mekaniske Verksteder, was a shipyard in Solheimsviken in Bergen, Norway. Established in 1855, it later also built a drydock in Laksevåg. The company folded in 1991, but the yard in Laksevåg is still in use.

References

Shipyards of Norway
1855 establishments in Norway
Manufacturing companies established in 1855
Manufacturing companies disestablished in 1991
Companies based in Bergen